Johnny Whyte (died 1985) was an English-born television screenwriter, who was considered a specialist in drama, best known for working on soap opera Coronation Street, having immigrated to Australia, he served as a script editor, as well as an executive producer on The Mavis Bramston Show and Australian soap opera Number 96.

Selected credits
Coronation Street (1961–62)
The Des O'Connor Show (1963)
The Dickie Henderson Show (1964) – writer
A Home of Your Own (1964)
Number 96 – script editor, writer, executive producer
The Unisexers (1975) – writer, development
Arcade (1980) – script editor
 The Mavis Bramston Show - Executive Producer

References

External links

English television writers
1985 deaths
20th-century English screenwriters